Jonathan Herbert Elworthy (1 July 1936 – 17 June 2005) was a New Zealand Member of Parliament for Oamaru and Waitaki, in the South Island, representing the National Party.

Early life
Elworthy was born in 1936, and received his education at Christ's College and Lincoln College. He was the brother of Peter Elworthy.

Member of Parliament

Elworthy represented the Oamaru electorate (–1978) and the Waitaki electorate (–1984) in the New Zealand House of Representatives.

He was Minister of Lands and Minister of Forests from 1981 to 1984 under Robert Muldoon.

Later life
Jonathan Elworthy was awarded the Queen's Silver Jubilee Medal for service to the community and the New Zealand 1990 Commemoration Medal for services to New Zealand.

Notes

References

Honoured by the Queen-New Zealand: 1953-1993 by Alister Taylor (1994, Who's Who Aotearoa, Auckland)

|- 

1936 births
2005 deaths
Lincoln University (New Zealand) alumni
New Zealand National Party MPs
People from Oamaru
People educated at Christ's College, Christchurch
Members of the New Zealand House of Representatives
New Zealand MPs for South Island electorates
Unsuccessful candidates in the 1984 New Zealand general election
Jonathan